Pankeyevo is a rural locality in Zakharkovsky Selsoviet Rural Settlement, Konyshyovsky District, Kursk Oblast, Russia. Population:

Geography 
The village is located on the Prutishche River and on its tributary Vablya River in the basin of the Seym, 66 km from the Russia–Ukraine border, 55.5 km north-west of Kursk, 9.5 km south-east of the district center – the urban-type settlement Konyshyovka, 11 km from the selsoviet center – Zakharkovo.

 Climate
Pankeyevo has a warm-summer humid continental climate (Dfb in the Köppen climate classification).

Transport 
Pankeyevo is located 64 km from the federal route  Ukraine Highway, 44 km from the route  Crimea Highway, 49 km from the route  (Trosna – M3 highway), 32.5 km from the road of regional importance  (Fatezh – Dmitriyev), 9 km from the road  (Lgov – Konyshyovka), 18 km from the road  (Kursk – Lgov – Rylsk – border with Ukraine), 11.5 km from the road of intermunicipal significance  (38K-017 – Nikolayevka – Shirkovo), 1 km from the road  (38K-023 – Olshanka – Marmyzhi – 38N-362), 6 km from the nearest railway halt 565 km (railway line Navlya – Lgov-Kiyevsky).

The rural locality is situated 61 km from Kursk Vostochny Airport, 150 km from Belgorod International Airport and 264 km from Voronezh Peter the Great Airport.

References

Notes

Sources

Rural localities in Konyshyovsky District